J.P. Davis  is an American screenwriter. Davis' first screenplay was Fighting Tommy Riley. The script was written with the sole intention of playing the title role. Oscar winner William Goldman was one of the first people to read the script, he mentored and encouraged Davis to move to Los Angeles. Davis procured a micro-budget of $130,000 to shoot Fighting Tommy Riley. Fighting Tommy Riley premiered at the Los Angeles Film Festival and then went on to play at the Hamptons Film Festival (where it won the Kodak Award) and at the San Francisco Film Festival. The film was well received and opened theatrically in Los Angeles, New York City and San Francisco. It is currently available on Netflix.

Raised on the Upper West Side of Manhattan, Davis attended the Berkshire School before graduating from Georgetown University’s School of Foreign Service.

References

External links
fightingtommyriley.com script_article.pdf
fightingtommyriley.com

Living people
American male film actors
American male television actors
American male screenwriters
Year of birth missing (living people)
People from the Upper West Side
Berkshire School alumni
Walsh School of Foreign Service alumni